Bill Patmon (born February 13, 1946) is an American businessman and former member of the Ohio House of Representatives who represented  the Tenth District from 2011 to 2018.

Career
Patmon grew up in Cleveland and graduated from Eastern Michigan University. Patmon was a member of Cleveland City Council from 1990 to 2001, and  served as the chairman of its Finance Committee from 1999 to 2001. Patmon initially was in the running for the Congressional seat available following the death of Stephanie Tubbs Jones, but failed to gain momentum. In 2009, he ran for mayor of Cleveland, but lost to Frank G. Jackson.

Ohio House of Representatives
After winning a crowded primary in May 2010 for Ohio's 10th House District which included incumbent Robin Belcher, he ran unopposed in the general election in what to many is considered the safest Democratic State House district. Patmon was sworn into his first term on January 3, 2011, and served as a member of the Education Committee, the State Government and Elections Committee, and the Transportation, Public Safety and Homeland Security Committee.

In 2012, Patmon won reelection to his seat unopposed.  He currently sits on the House Transportation, Public Safety, and Homeland Security Committee, the Ways and Means Committee, and the State and Local Government Committee.

Patmon is known for having introduced several pieces of legislation in his first term with a counted eighteen bills that ranged in topics from education to healthcare.  Patmon also introduced legislation for specialty license plates that highlight Cleveland as the starting point for Superman, to celebrate Superman's 75th anniversary in 2013, and to acknowledge Jerry Siegel and Joe Shuster as the co-creators of the best-known superhero in the world.

Patmon has seen much success in his second term as State Representative including the passage of House Bill 147, also known as the Lizzie B. Byrd Act, named in honor of his mother who was diagnosed with breast cancer.  Patmon has expressed openly his experiences as he watched his mother face her diagnosis and subsequent reluctance over cancer treatment options expressing that "It stung.  It stung deep.".  The legislation, signed into law on December 19, 2014, requires physicians to present patients with all possible options upfront and to ensure that patients know that breast cancer reconstructive surgery can be covered by health insurance.

As the Representative for inner Cleveland, Patmon is against allowing concealed carry of guns in restaurants, bars and stadiums, notably Cleveland Browns Stadium.

References

External links
Bill Patmon for State Representative official campaign site

Living people
African-American state legislators in Ohio
Cleveland City Council members
Eastern Michigan University alumni
Democratic Party members of the Ohio House of Representatives
1946 births
21st-century American politicians
21st-century African-American politicians
20th-century African-American people